The Shiromani Gurdwara Parbandhak Committee ( SGPC; "Supreme Gurdwara Management Committee") is an organization in India responsible for the management of Gurdwaras, Sikh places of worship in states of Punjab and Himachal Pradesh and the union territory of Chandigarh. SGPC also administers Darbar Sahib in Amritsar.

The SGPC is governed by the president of SGPC. The SGPC manages the security, financial, facility maintenance and religious aspects of Gurdwaras as well as keeping archaeologically rare and sacred artifacts, including weapons, clothes, books and writings of the Sikh Gurus.

Bibi Jagir Kaur became the first woman to be elected president of the SGPC for the second time in September 2004. She had held the same post from March 1999 to November 2000.

History

Foundation
In 1920 the emerging Akali leadership summoned a general assembly of the Sikhs holding all shades of opinion on 15 November 1920 in vicinity of the Akal Takht in Amritsar.  The purpose of this assembly was to elect a representative committee of the Sikhs to administer the Harimandir Sahib Complex and other important historical gurdwaras. Two days before the proposed conference the British government set up its own committee consisting of 36 Sikhs to manage the Harimandir Sahib. Sikhs held their scheduled meeting and elected a bigger committee consisting of 175 members and named it Shiromani Gurdwara Parbandhak Committee. The members of the government appointed committee were also included in it. Harbans Singh Attari became vice president and Sunder Singh Ramgarhia became secretary of the committee. By that time Master Tara Singh had started taking interest in Sikh religious affairs. He was one of the 175 members elected to the committee. The formation of Shiromani Gurdwara Parbandhak Committee provided a focal point for the movement for the reformation of Sikh religious places. The Committee began to take over management of gurdwaras one by one, and were resisted by incumbent mahants.

Starting in late 1920, a large number of reformers both in urban and rural Punjab had joined to form separate and independent religious orders called jathas.  The primary purpose of a jatha was to gain control over local gurdwaras. A jatha under the command of a jathedar would occupy a shrine and try to take over management in its favor from its current incumbents. Sometimes the transfer went peacefully especially in the case of smaller Gurdwaras with less income resources.  This was done sometimes with the threat of force.

The Sikh leadership was fully aware of the importance of the press for the success of any movement. It enlisted the active support and sympathy of some of the important nationalist papers in the country like 'The Independent', Swaraj (Hindi), The Tribune, Liberal, Kesri (Urdu), Milap (Urdu), Zamindar (Urdu) and Bande Matram (Hindi).Two of the vernacular dailies Akali (Pbi.) and the Akali-te-Pardesi (Urdu), edited by Master Tara Singh also  played an important role. It brought the necessary awakening among the Sikh masses and prepared them to undertake the struggle for reform. With the direct and indirect support of the Central Sikh League, the Indian National Congress and the Shiromani Gurdwara Parbandhak Committee, the Shiromani Akali Dal started a non-violent struggle against the government for the control of the Gurdwaras. The reports of some immoral acts perpetrated at Tarn-Taran reached the Shiromani Gurdwara Parbandhak Committee at its meeting on 14 January 1921. A fortnight earlier a local jatha was beaten up and not allowed to perform kirtan at the gurdwara. It decided to send a jatha from Amritsar under Jathedar Teja Singh Bhuchar. Jathedar Kartar Singh Jhabbar with Akalis from 'Khara Sauda Bar' joined him. On 25 January, a group of about forty workers took over the control of Sri Darbar Sahib Tarn-Taran from its Mahant. In the ensuing conflict two Akalis were killed and several others wounded by the henchmen of the Mahants. The Mahants were ousted from the Gurdwara and the Shiromani Gurdwara Parbandhak Committee appointed a managing committee.

Gurdwaras Act of 1925

In early 1920s,  Malcolm Hailey, the governor of the Punjab showed his readiness to assist the Sikhs in taking possession of all the important Gurdwaras in the province through a five-member committee constituted by the Sikh members of the legislative council. Hailey presented a draft of a new Gurdwara Bill to the Akali leaders imprisoned in Lahore fort. Master Tara Singh, Bhag singh Advocate, Gurcharn singh Advocate, Teja Singh Akerpuri (Jathedar AkalTakht Sahib) Sohan Singh Josh and Sardar Teja Singh Samundri studied each clause of the bill carefully. The bill met all the Akali demands and was signed into law on 28 July 1925 by the Viceroy of India after its ratification by the Punjab legislative council. The Act came into force on 1 November 1925 with a gazette notification from the government of Punjab.

The Act made a Central Gurdwara Board elected by the Sikhs  to be the custodian of all important Sikh places of worship. The first meeting of the Gurdwara board passed a resolution that its designation be changed to Shiromani Gurdwara Parbandhak Committee, which was accepted by the government. Thus ended what came to be known in common parlance as the 'Third Sikh War'. The Punjab government withdrew its orders declaring the Shiromani Gurdwara Parbandhak Committee and other Akali organs as unlawful associations and recognized the Shiromani Gurdwara Parbandhak Committee as a representative body of the Sikhs. In making the Punjab government agree to such recognition, the Akali leadership undoubtedly scored a victory over the bureaucracy. The Sikh Gurdwara bill met most of the demands of the Sikhs, but the government was willing to release the prisoners conditionally i.e. on the understanding to be given by the Akalis that they would agree to work for the Gurdwara Act. The Shiromani Akali Dal and the executive declared conditions imposed for the release of prisoners as wholly unnecessary, unjust and derogatory. Among the prominent Akalis, Mehtab Singh and Giani Sher Singh along with twenty other Akali leaders accepted the conditional release. Master Tara Singh, Bhag Singh Advocate, Teja Singh Samundari, Teja singh Akerpuri (Jathedar Akal Takht) and Fifteen other Akalis did not come out as government emphasis on eliciting written assurance and acceptance was to Master Tara Singh, an attack on the self-respect of the Sikhs. He said, "We ourselves have enacted this Act and we are responsible for implementing it, then why this condition?" Teja Singh Samundari died of a heart attack in the jail after some time. The Punjab Government failed to prove the charges against Master Tara Singh and the remaining Akalis, few months later they all were released unconditionally. The courage and sacrifice shown by the Akalis during the trial very soon drove the Mehtab Singh's group out of the political field and led to a rift in the Akali ranks, as the newly released Akalis condemned Mehtab Singh's group as collaborators. Mehtab Singh's group was also known as 'Rai Bahadur Party'. This group had majority in the committee and Mehtab Singh was elected its President. The Akali Party launched a campaign against the conditionally released leaders. When the new elections for the Shiromani Gurdwara Parbandhak Committee were held, the Akali Party won majority and the newly elected Shiromani Gurdwara Parbandhak Committee elected Kharak Singh as the President and Master Tara Singh as the Vice President. Since Baba Kharak Singh had not yet been released the responsibility of the president fell on the shoulders of Master Tara Singh.At the time of 1996 the first time SGPC election is held in Himachal Pradesh and the first person who won from that seat is the candidate of Panthak Akalidal whose name is Satnam Singh Gill.

1953 amendment to Gurdwaras Act of 1925
In 1953, an amendment to the 1925 act allowed the reservation of 20 out 140 seats on the SGPC for the members of the Sikh scheduled castes

2016 amendment to Gurdwaras Act of 1925
The 2016 amendment to the act by the Indian parliament stripped around 7 million 'Sehajdhari' Sikhs of voting in the SGPC elections

Presidents

The president of the Shiromani Gurdwara Parbandhak Committee (SGPC) is elected by the Members of SGPC. The president holds powers to organise the meetings of SGPC and deal with matters related with issues of Sikh religion and oversees the managements of the Gurdwaras. Since 2008, the president also serves as Chancellor of Sri Guru Granth Sahib World University.

In 1920 SGPC was established when Gurdwara Reform Movement was started. Sundar Singh Majithia was appointed first President of the committee. This post got legal status after the passing of Sikh Gurdwaras Act, 1925 by legislation in British India.

After passing of this act Baba Kharak Singh became the President. The longest-served president of SGPC till now is Gurcharan Singh Tohra and shortest-served is Gopal Singh Qaumi who served only for one day in June 1933. The first and the only woman and also incumbent president is Jagir Kaur.

List of presidents

Criticism

Casteism 

The SGPC has been accused of representing the interests of Jat Sikhs over other castes and its membership and leadership being dominated by members of the Jat community, which makes other castes feel left out and discriminated against. In defence, the SGPC's early history of fighting casteism has been highlighted and the actions they take against reported instances of caste-based discrimination. Also, the current Jathedar of the Akal Takht claims to be from a lower-caste background.

Allegations of apathy to heritage 

The SGPC has been criticized by Sikh organizations and individuals for having an apathetic and destructive attitude towards historical Sikh heritage sites, artwork, and architecture. In response to these criticisms, the SGPC announced that it has launched a project to document Sikh heritage. As many as ninety percent of Sikh heritage monuments have been destroyed in Punjab in the name of renovation and kar seva. Historic trees associated with Sikh history are also at risk due to neglectful and poorly made judgements without consulting botanical experts, such as strangling the roots and base with concrete and marble, covering the trees with fibre glass, and erecting steel beams around the trunks. Efforts are ongoing to revive and preserve the life of the Beri trees surrounding the Golden Temple. The SGPC has also been criticized for their lack of action on preventing beadbi (desecrations) of the Guru Granth Sahib and other Sikh scriptures from occurring. Large amounts of historical Sikh scriptural manuscripts have been systematically "cremated" (burnt to destruction) over the years at secretive ‘Angitha Sahib’ gurdwaras in Punjab.

Lack of action towards missionaries 

After being criticized for their lack of action in responding the growing number of Sikhs leaving the fold and converting to Christianity and not addressing the caste and social issues that gives impetus to the phenomenon, and as a response to the allegations and growing tension between the local Sikh and Christian communities, the SGPC had announced a drive called Ghar Ghar Andar Dharamsaal (meaning 'sacred shrine within every home') to counter missionaries targeting Sikhs and to educate the Sikh population on the tenets of their faith.

Monopoly on determining Sikh identity 

The SGPC has been accused for enforcing their standards on who and who is not considered a Sikh. This leaves many heterodox sects, such as Nirmalas, Nirankaris, Udasis, and others feeling marginalized and erased from the Sikh community by the orthodox SGPC. The SGPC has clarified that members of the Udasi and Nirmala sects are "Sikhs".

Sexism 

Women currently are unofficially banned from singing or performing kirtan (religious devotional singing and musical performance) in sanctum sanctorum of the Golden Temple, a gurdwara under the management of the SGPC. The Punjab Legislative Assembly passed a motion to allow women to perform there in 2019. In 1999, Bibi Jagir Kaur became the first female president of the SGPC.

Religious discrimination 

Traditional Muslim rababis and kirtanis, including claimed descendants of Bhai Mardana (companion of Guru Nanak), have been banned from performing at the Golden Temple since 1947 as the SGPC has altered the rules to only allow baptized Khalsa Sikhs to perform services at the Golden Temple. Before partition, they were granted special allowance to perform at the temple.

Corruption 
Allegations of large-scale corruption have been claimed against the SGPC.

See also
Jathedar of Akal Takht
Chief Khalsa Diwan
Balwant Singh Nandgarh
Delhi Sikh Gurdwara Management Committee
Haryana Sikh Gurdwara Parbandhak Committee
Pakistan Sikh Gurdwara Prabandhak Committee

References

Further reading
Dilgeer, Dr Harjinder Singh, Shiromani Akali Dal (1920–2000), Sikh University Press, Belgium, 2000
Dilgeer, Dr Harjinder Singh, Shiromani Gurdwara Parbandhak Committee Kiven Bani  (Punjabi), Amritsar, S.G.P.C., 2001.
Dilgeer, Dr Harjinder Singh, Sikh Twareekh  5 volumes (Punjabi), Sikh University Press, Belgium, 2007.
Dilgeer, Dr Harjinder Singh, Sikh History, 10 volumes (English), Sikh University Press, Belgium, 2010–11. 10 volumes (English)

External links
Shiromani Gurdwara Prabhandak Committee

Sikh history book by SGPC
Sikh history book
SGPC Explained

Amritsar
Organisations based in Punjab, India
Sikhism in India
Sikh organisations
Gurdwaras in India
Organizations established in 1920
1920 establishments in India